Margareta Cederfelt (born in 1959 in Limhamn Sweden) is a Swedish politician of the Moderate Party. She was a member of the Riksdag from 2000 to 2002 and a replacement member of the Riksdag from 1999 to 2000. Since 2006 she has again been a replacement member. In that role Cederfelt has been substituting for Fredrik Reinfeldt since May 2008.

References

 

1959 births
20th-century Swedish women politicians
20th-century Swedish politicians
21st-century Swedish women politicians
Living people
Members of the Riksdag 1998–2002
Members of the Riksdag 2006–2010
Members of the Riksdag 2010–2014
Members of the Riksdag 2014–2018
Members of the Riksdag 2018–2022
Members of the Riksdag 2022–2026
Members of the Riksdag from the Moderate Party
Women members of the Riksdag